Holagundi  is a village in the southern state of Karnataka, India. It is located in the Hadagalli taluk of Bellary district in Karnataka.

Demographics
 India census, Holagundi had a population of 6578 with 3316 males and 3262 females.

See also
 Bellary
 Districts of Karnataka

References

External links
 http://Bellary.nic.in/

Villages in Bellary district